Rajesh Kumar Mishra, also known as Pappu Bhartaul (born 30 June 1967) is an Indian politician from Bharatiya Janata Party (BJP). He has been an MLA twice in Uttar Pradesh. He represented Bithari Chainpur seat of Bareilly district as an MLA from 2017 to 2022.

Posts held

Controversies 
He was engaged in several controversies during his tenure. In July 2019, Mishra was in a controversy when his daughter released a couple of videos, saying she feared for her life from his father and her brother because she married a Dalit. She was given police protection by the government and continues to live under the security cover. He is facing 22 cases against him.

References

External links 
 Rajesh Kumar Mishra Urf Pappu Bhartaul on UP Vidhan Sabha

Bharatiya Janata Party politicians from Uttar Pradesh
Uttar Pradesh MLAs 2017–2022
People from Bareilly district
1967 births
Living people